Meyyaram is a book written by V. O. Chidambaram Pillai while confined in the Central Prison, Coimbatore, India, from 9 July 1908 to 1 December 1910. The book was later publish upon his release with the first edition being printed in 1914.

This book was written in dedication to the first person who wrote the history of Tamil literature, Thiru Srinivasa Pillai from Tanjore. The title of the book carries the meaning of truth (Mey) and virtue (Aram).

The book consists of 125 chapters which are divided into 5 sections. The first part of the book consists of 30 chapters and is written for students, talking about the body, mind and soul. The second part also consists of 30 chapters talking about family life. The third part where Chidambaram teaches how to govern a country has 50 chapters. The fourth part which touches on Truth covers 10 chapters. The fifth part shows the reader the way to reach the state of Godliness in the final five chapters.

History of the Book
Meyyaram was written by Chidambaram while in jail (from 9 July 1908 to 1 December 1910). The book was published after his release. Chidambaram dedicated the book to Thiru Srinivasa Pillai from Tanjore, the first person to write a history of Tamil literature. The book was published three times. The first edition was printed in Chennai by Progressive Press in 1914.  The second edition was printed in Chennai by Kalaratnagara Press in 1917. The third edition was printed in Ambasamuththiram (near Thirunelveli) by Shanmugavilas Press in 1930. The Government of Tamil Nadu has bought the copyright to Chidambaram's work and it may now be published by anybody.

Subject matter broken down by section
The aim of Meyyaram is to prepare the reader to lead a moral life.  The word "Meyyaram" is composed of two elements: "Mey" and "Aram". "Mey" means the truth and "Aram" means virtue.  In this work, Chidambaram explains these concepts in short, simple, and easily understood verses.  The book has 125 chapters, divided into 5 parts.  Each chapter contains 10 verses, that is, 10 lines.  Each verse gives a piece of advice.

The first part of the book has 30 chapters, and is intended for students. In this part, Chidambaram says that childhood is the appropriate age for learning. The child should learn what he needs to learn, and should avoid other things. He should give importance to his duty, obedience, education and good health.

Here, Chidambaram writes about the body, mind and soul.  He explains that the mind is responsible for our activities, so the mind should control the body, while the soul should guide the mind. It also explains that one's life is self-determined, while God is only an observer.  In other words, whether one's life has a good or bad outcome is determined by whether one's actions were good or bad. Rather than believing fate to be predetermined, actions play a prominent role in determining one's future.

Chidambaram urges students to avoid vices, such as: meat, alcohol, theft, slander, lying, alms, jealousy, evil friendship, and gossip.  He teaches students to give importance to virtues such as good friendship, gratitude, equity, modesty, morality, assiduity, perseverance.

The second part contains 30 chapters, of which twenty have been translated. This part speaks about family life. It advises us on how to select a spouse, how to lead family, etc. It helps us overcome ignorance, folly, procrastination, forgetfulness, sluggishness, etc. It instructs us to avoid too much sleep, pride, dread, covetousness, etc.

The third part has 50 chapters, in which Chidambaram explains how to govern a country.

The fourth part contains 10 chapters and speaks about Truth.

The fifth and final part consists of only 5 chapters.  It explains the way to reach the state of Godliness.

Structure of each chapter
Each chapter is precisely structured with 10 lines to a chapter. The first line explains the title. In the following lines, Chidambaram lists the positive and negative points. The final line explains the moral of that chapter.  For example, the 29th chapter speaks about Assiduity.  The first line explains what assiduity is: having the intention to aim high.  The second line impresses the importance of assiduity. The third line speaks about the disadvantage of not having it. The fourth and fifth lines compare these two types of persons. The remaining lines advise us to have assiduity. Thus, each chapter is complete in itself.

Quotations
Each verse is simple and didactic.  For example, the 12th verse states, "The doer of action is the determiner of fate". In Tamil there are four words:

விதிசெய் கர்த்தா வினைசெய் யுயிரே.

This verse is a token example of Chidambaram's teaching that one's fate is self-determined.  The language exemplifies Chidambaram's concise, clear, and understandable style of writing.

Revolutionary ideas of Chidambaram in Meyyaram
Meyyaram contains some notions that were revolutionary for its time.  Many of these notions pertained to women's rights.  Chidambaram writes in the second line of this book, "Men and women have the right to study" (although women were not allowed to go to school when this was written).  Elsewhere in the book, Chidambaram promotes the equal treatment of men and women. In the 7th chapter, he explains the qualities of a good teacher, and declares that both men and women have the right to become a teacher.

In the 34th chapter, he writes in the first line, "The wise among the couple can govern the family," and in the second line, "It is vain talk to say that the male is superior".  Chidambaram makes it clear that a woman can be wiser than a man.  He also says that the husband and the wife should consult each other before executing anything.

Another culturally revolutionary idea concerns the practice of remarrying, which was culturally unacceptable.  In the 33rd chapter, Chidambaram writes that it is dignified to marry a person who has lost a spouse.

Peace of mind
Chidambaram aims to help us attain peace of mind by guiding us to what we should do and what we should not do.  According to Chidambaram, to lead a better life money is not enough; peace of mind is also needed. To explain this idea, Chidambaram uses an example. One can buy a comfortable bed but without peace of mind one cannot sleep. We should protect our body, because it is a supreme tool which can do many things. Then we should control our mind because our mind is a great power which can create, protect and destroy. We should take care of our parents and our children, who are our real wealth.  If we do all of these things, Chidambaram claims that we will find peace of mind.

Indian non-fiction books
Tamil-language literature